Marcílio Luís Evangelista dos Santos (born 12 December 1964) is a Brazilian former footballer who played as a forward.

Club career
Born in Santo André, São Paulo, Santos started his senior career with Brasília Futebol Clube. He went on to play mostly in Portugal, amassing Primeira Liga totals of 137 matches and 25 goals at the service of S.C. Braga and G.D. Chaves, during five seasons.

Santos made his debut in the competition on 27 September 1987, playing the full 90 minutes in a 1–1 home draw against FC Porto.

Personal life
Santos' son, Luís Gustavo, was also a professional footballer.

References

External links

1964 births
Living people
People from Santo André, São Paulo
Brazilian footballers
Association football forwards
Campeonato Brasileiro Série A players
Brasília Futebol Clube players
CR Vasco da Gama players
Sociedade Esportiva do Gama players
Primeira Liga players
Liga Portugal 2 players
Segunda Divisão players
S.C. Braga players
G.D. Chaves players
U.D. Leiria players
Associação Naval 1º de Maio players
Brazilian expatriate footballers
Expatriate footballers in Portugal
Brazilian expatriate sportspeople in Portugal
Brazilian football managers
Footballers from São Paulo (state)